Qadiani or Qadiyani is a religious slur used to refer to Ahmadi Muslims, primarily in Pakistan. The term originates from Qadian, a small town in northern India, the birthplace of Mirza Ghulam Ahmad, the founder of the Ahmadiyya movement. While it is pejorative to the Ahmadiyya Muslim Community, it is used in official Pakistani documents.

Pakistan officially persecutes Ahmadiyya and uses the term Qadiani to label members of the religion. Pakistan's Second Amendment to the Constitution officially declares Ahmadiyya to be non-Muslims. Ordinance XX officially labels Ahmadi Muslims as Qadiani and prohibits them from any religious or social practices of the Muslim faith. The fourth caliph of the community, Mirza Tahir Ahmad, was forced to flee Pakistan under threat of arrest in 1984, prompting a diaspora of followers to the UK, Germany, and Canada. Ahmadiyya members are targets of death threats by majority Muslims, both inside Pakistan and in diaspora refuges.

The term is sometimes used in an academic context to distinguish the main Ahmadiyya Muslim Jamaat, referred to as Qadiani, from the separatist Lahore Ahmadiyya Movement for the Propagation of Islam, referred to as Lahori.

See also
Mirzai
Ahmadiyya in Pakistan
Persecution of Ahmadis
Human rights in Pakistan

References

Persecution of Ahmadis
Islam-related slurs
Ahmadiyya in Pakistan